This is the complete list of Asian Games medalists in rugby union from 1998 to 2018.

Rugby union

Men

Rugby sevens

Men

Women

References

External links
Asian Games Results

Rugby union
medalists